Carmina Burana is the third solo album by Ray Manzarek released in 1983. It is a recording of Carl Orff's Carmina Burana.

Cover art 
Cover art features photo-montage of illustrations by Hieronymus Bosch (spelled on original release as Hieronymus Beach) and Jan van Eyck (Arnolfini Portrait) and modern items like guitar, drums, reel-to-reel and keyboards. Cover design by Lynn Robb. Photography by Larry Williams.

Track listing
Music composed by Carl Orff. Original Latin lyrics adopted to English (C) B. Schott's Söhne by permission of European American Music
"Destiny: Ruler of the World – The Wheel of Fortune (O Fortuna)"
"Destiny: Ruler of the World – The Wounds of Fate (Fortune plango)"
"Springtime: The Face of Spring (Veris leta facies)"
"Springtime: Sunrise (Omnia sol temperat)"
"Springtime: Welcome (Ecce gratum)"
"Springtime: The Dance (Tanz)" – (Tanz Mix: Ich Schau D mix)
"Springtime: Sweetest Boy (Dulcissime)"
"Springtime: If the Whole World Was Mine (Were diu werlt)"
"In the Tavern: Boiling Rage (Estuans interius)"
"In the Tavern: The Roasted Swan (Olim lacus)"
"In the Tavern: In the Tavern (In taberna)"
"The Court of Love: Love Flies Everywhere (Amor volat)"
"The Court of Love: A Young Girl (Stetit puella)"
"The Court of Love: Come, My Beauty (Veni veni venias)"
"The Court of Love: The Lovers (Blanziflor et Helena)"
"Destiny: Ruler of the World – The Wheel of Fortune (O Fortuna)"

Personnel
Ray Manzarek – piano, organ, keyboards, arrangements
Michael Riesman – synthesizers, orchestrations, conductor
Larry Anderson – drums
Ted Hall – guitar
Doug Hodges – bass
Adam Holzman – synthesizers
Jack Kripl – saxophones, flutes

Principal Singers
Catherine Aks
Ma Premm Alimo
Bruce Fifer
Maryann Hart
Cindy Hewes
Michael Hume
Elliot Levine
Dora Ohrenstein
Patrick Romano
Kimball Wheeler

Production notes 
Recording Engineer: John Beverly Jones
Mixing Engineer: Joe Chiccarelli
Recorded at A&M Recording Studios, Hollywood, CA. Cheerokee Recording Studios, Hollywood, CA. Greene St. Recording Studios, New York, N.Y.
Mixed at Capitol Recording Studios, Hollywood, CA
Digital Mastering at Masterdisc, New York, N.Y.

Liner notes 

In 1983 Ray Manzarek, long attracted to the spiritual power of Carmina Burana, chose to interpret the piece in a contemporary framework. This presentation intends to create enchanted pictures; to conjure up the ecstasy expressed by the lyrics, an enhanced intense feeling for life akin to the passions and revelry of the wandering poets of so long ago.

References 

1983 albums
Ray Manzarek albums
A&M Records albums
Albums recorded at Greene St. Recording